Walter Zimmermann (born 15 April 1949) is a German composer associated with the Cologne School.

Born in Schwabach, Germany, Zimmermann studied composition in Germany with Werner Heider and Mauricio Kagel, the theory of musical intelligence at the Institute of Sonology in Utrecht (now located in The Hague), and computer music at Colgate University in New York.

Zimmermann's works are infused by a personal adaptation of minimal technique.  Whereas many early American minimalist composers were influenced in their works by rock, jazz, and world musics, Zimmermann has drawn a great deal of inspiration from his Franconian heritage.  A number of his works, particularly his groups of pieces known as Lokale Musik, use the traditional music of this area as source material.  These works frequently begin with melodic material derived from Franconian folk songs, which are rearranged and transformed in novel ways.

In 1976, Zimmermann published a collection of interviews with American musicians and composers entitled Desert Plants:  Conversations With 23 American Musicians.

References
 Zimmermann, Walter (1976).  Desert Plants:  Conversations With 23 American Musicians.  Vancouver, British Columbia, Canada:  A. R. C. Publications.

External links
Walter Zimmermann page

20th-century classical composers
21st-century classical composers
German classical composers
1949 births
Living people
German male classical composers
20th-century German composers
21st-century German composers
20th-century German male musicians
21st-century German male musicians
People from Schwabach